TVP3 Opole is one of the regional branches of the TVP, Poland's public television broadcaster. It serves the entire Opole Voivodeship.

External links 
 

Telewizja Polska
Television channels and stations established in 2005
Mass media in Opole